Euchilichthys royauxi is a species of upside-down catfish native to the Congo Basin of Angola, Cameroon, the Democratic Republic of the Congo and Zambia.  This species grows to a length of  TL. Euchilichthys royauxi was named by George Albert Boulenger in 1902 from specimens taken in the Ubangi, its specific name royauxi is in honor of the Belgian officer Louis Joseph Royaux who led the expedition that collected the type specimen.

References

 
 

Mochokidae
Catfish of Africa
Fish of Angola
Freshwater fish of Cameroon
Fish of the Democratic Republic of the Congo
Fish of Zambia
Fish described in 1902